The mass–action ratio, often denoted by , is the ratio of product concentrations to reactant concentrations at one given time which may be at equilibrium or not.

This assumes that the stoichiometric amounts are all unity. If not, then each concentration must be raised to the power of its corresponding stoichiometric amount. If the product and reactant concentrations are at equilibrium then the mass–action ratio will equal the equilibrium constant. At equilibrium:

The ratio of the mass–action ratio to the equilibrium constant is often called the disequilibrium ratio, denoted by the symbol .

At equilibrium . When the reaction is out of equilibrium, but is always greater than zero. If the reaction has a negative free energy, then . 

If the natural log is taken on both sides and multiply both sides by RT, we obtain:

However,  is the standard free energy, so that  is the free energy of the reaction.

References

Other sources
Atkins, P.W. (1978). Physical Chemistry Oxford University Press 
Trevor Palmer (2001) Enzymes: biochemistry, biotechnology and clinical chemistry Chichester Horwood Publishing 

Physical chemistry